Betting arbitrage ("sure bets", sports arbitrage) is an example of arbitrage arising on betting markets due to either bookmakers' differing opinions on event outcomes or errors. When conditions allow, by placing one bet per each outcome with different betting companies, the bettor can make a profit regardless of the outcome. Mathematically, arbitrage occurs when there are a set of odds, which represent all mutually exclusive outcomes that cover all state space possibilities (i.e. all outcomes) of an event, whose implied probabilities add up to less than 1. In the bettors' slang an arbitrage is often referred to as an arb; people who take advantage of these arbitrage opportunities are called arbers.

Background 
Arbitrage betting involves relatively large sums of money, given that 98% of arbitrage opportunities return less than 1.2%. The practice is usually detected quickly by bookmakers, who typically hold an unfavorable view of it, and in the past this could result in half of an arbitrage bet being canceled, or even the closure of the bettor's account.

Although arbitrage betting has existed since the beginnings of bookmaking, the rise of the Internet, odds-comparison websites and betting exchanges have made the practice easier to perform. On the other hand, these changes also made it easier for bookmakers to keep their odds in line with the market, because arbitrage bettors are basically acting as market makers.

In Britain, a practice has developed in which highly experienced "key men" employ others to place bets on their behalf, so as to avoid detection and increase accessibility to retail bookmakers and allow the financiers or key arbitragers to stay at a computer to keep track of market movement.

Arbitrage is a fast-paced process and its successful performance requires much time, experience, dedication and discipline, and especially liquidity.

Theory 

There are a number of potential arbitrage deals. Below is an explanation of some of them including formulas and risks associated with them. The table below introduces a number of variables that will be used to formalise the arbitrage models.

Using bookmakers 
This type of arbitrage takes advantage of different odds offered by different bookmakers. For an example of an event with only two possible outcomes (e.g., a tennis match in which either Federer wins or Henman wins), the two bookmakers have different ideas of who has the best chances of winning. They offer the following fixed-odds gambling on the outcomes of the event in both fractional and decimal format:

Fractional odds:

Decimal odds:

Bookmaker 1 will in this example expect to earn 5.34% on bets on the tennis game. For an individual bookmaker, the sum of the inverse of all outcomes of an event will always be greater than 1.
 and 

Inverse of decimal odds:

The idea of arbitrage betting is to find odds at different bookmakers, where the sum of the inverse of all the outcomes are below 1, meaning that the bookmakers disagree on the chances of the outcomes. This discrepancy can be used to obtain a profit.

For instance if one places a bet on outcome 1 at bookmaker 2 and outcome 2 at bookmaker 1:

Placing a bet of $100 on the most likely outcome with the lowest odds (outcome 1 with bookmaker 2) and a bet of $36.67  on outcome 2 at bookmaker 1 would ensure the bettor a profit. When there are more than two possible outcomes the value of the subsequent bets can be calculated with respect to the lowest quoted odds.

In case outcome 1 comes out, one could collect  from bookmaker 2. In case outcome 2 comes out, one could collect  from bookmaker 1. One would have invested $136.67, but have collected $143, a profit of $6.33 (4.6%) no matter the outcome of the event.

If one wishes to place stake  at outcome 1, then one should place  at outcome 2, to even out the odds, and receive the same return no matter the outcome of the event.

Or in other words, if there are two outcomes, a 1/1 and a 2/1, by covering the 1/1 with $500 and the 2/1 with $333, one is guaranteed to win $1000 at a cost of $833, giving a 20% profit. More often profits exists around the 4% mark or less.

Reducing the risk of human error is vital being that the mathematical formula is sound and only external factors add "risk". Numerous online arbitrage calculator tools exist to help bettors get the math right. For example, arbitrage calculators can handle calculations for both book arbitrage ("back/back" or "lay/lay") and "back/lay" arbitrage opportunities on an intra-exchange or inter-exchange basis, and are free.

The amount required to bet on each possibility in order to ensure profit can be calculated by

Back-lay sports 
Betting exchanges have opened up a new range of arbitrage possibilities since on the exchanges it is possible to lay (i.e. to bet against) as well as to back an outcome. Arbitrage using only the back or lay side might occur on betting exchanges. It is in principle the same as the arbitrage using different bookmakers. Arbitrage using back and lay side is possible if a lay bet on one exchange provides shorter odds than a back bet on another exchange or bookmaker. However, the commission charged by the bookmakers and exchanges must be included into calculations.

Back-lay sports arbitrage is often called "scalping" or "trading". Scalping is not actually arbitrage, but short-term trading. In the context of sports arbitrage betting a scalping trader or scalper looks to make many small profits, which in time can add up. In theory a trader could turn a small investment into large profits by re-investing his earlier profits into future bets so as to generate exponential growth. Scalping relies on liquidity in the markets and that the odds will fluctuate around a mean point. A key advantage to scalping on one exchange is that most exchanges charge commission only on the net winnings in a particular event, thus ensuring that even the smallest favorable difference in the odds will guarantee some profit.

Bonus sports 
Many bookmakers offer first time users a signup bonus in the range $10–200 for depositing an initial amount. They typically demand that this amount is wagered a number of times before the bonus can be withdrawn. Bonus sport arbitraging, also known as matched betting, is a form of sports arbitraging where the bettor hedges or backs their bets as usual, but since they received the bonus, a small loss can be allowed on each wager (2–5%), which comes off their profit. In this way the bookmakers wagering demand can be met and the initial deposit and sign up bonus can be withdrawn with little loss.

The advantage over usual betting arbitrage is that it is a lot easier to find bets with an acceptable loss, instead of an actual profit. Since most bookmakers offer these bonuses this can potentially be exploited to harvest the sign up bonuses.

By signing up to various bookmakers, it is possible to turn these "free" bets into cash fairly quickly, and either making a small arbitrage, or in the majority of cases, making a small loss on each bet, or trade.  However, it is relatively time consuming to find close matched bets or arbitrages, which is where a middleman service is useful. As many bookmakers require a certain turnover of the bonus amount, matching money from different bookmakers against each other enables the player to in effect quickly "play free" the money of the losing bookmaker and in effect transfer it to the winning bookmaker. By avoiding most of the turnover requirements in this way the player can usually expect a 70-80% return on investment.

As well as spending time physically matching odds from various bet sites to exchanges, the other draw back with bonus bagging and arbitrage trading in this sense is that often the free bets are "non-stake returned".  This effectively reduces the odds, in decimal format, by 1.  Therefore, in order to reduce "losses" on the free bet, it is necessary to place a bet with high odds, so that the percentage difference of the decrease in odds is minimised.

Shop arbitrage (sharbing) 

Shop arbitrage (also known as sharbing or shop-arbing) is the process of using a betting shop's coupons and a betting exchange to create an arbitrage position. This is made possible because online prices change quickly to close these positions and betting shops are slower to change the prices on their printed coupons.

Risks 

While often claimed to be "risk-free", in the past it only true if an arbitrage is successfully completed; in the past, there were several threats to this:

Disappearance of arbitrage: Arbitrages in online sports markets have a median lifetime of around 15 minutes, after which the difference in odds underpinning them vanishes through betting activity. Without rapid alerting and action, it is possible to fail to make all the "legs" of the arbitrage before it vanishes, thus transforming it from a risk-free arbitrage into a conventional bet with the usual risks involved.  High street bookmakers however, offer their odds days in advance and rarely change them once they have been set.  These arbitrages can have a lifetime of several hours.
Hackers: Due to the large number of accounts that have to be created and managed (containing personal details such as email, name, address, e-wallet, credit card information and often even a copy of the bettor's ID/passport or driver's license), arbitrage traders are highly susceptible to cyber fraud, such as bank account theft. While making deposits is usually made easy and quick, making withdrawals often requires proof of identity in the form of passport/driver license, copies of which need to be shared with the bookmakers via fax/email or even postal mail, which causes additional identity theft risks. Traders are often attracted to high odds comparison sites that yield high percentage profits per stake (5-30%); this is often used by hackers to lure a high number of arbitrage bettors that then place large sums of money on these arbs, only to lose all of the profit and even entire savings in bank accounts to hackers or untrustworthy websites, which may further use the gathered data to sell personal data to criminals.
Making errors as an arber: In the excitement of the action and due to the high number of bets placed, it is not uncommon to make a mistake (like traders on financial markets). For example, the appropriate stakes may be incorrectly calculated, or be placed on the wrong "legs" of the arb, locking in a loss, or there may be inadequate funds in one of the accounts to complete the arb. Those errors might temporarily have an important impact. In the long term, the benefit will depend on the odds.  For example, one could actually make more money by placing the "wrong" bet where the outcome happens to be beneficial, though not justified by the arbitrage calculation.  However, repetition of this stroke of luck is unlikely, assuming the bookmaker has calculated the odds so they make a profit. Websites and bet placement interfaces differ between bookmakers, so that arbitrage bettors need to be familiar with different web interfaces. In some sports different bookmakers deal with outcomes in different ways (they differ in their handling of - for example - player withdrawal due to injury in tennis, overtime in ice hockey), meaning that both "legs" can lose. Matching terms for all bookmakers is time-consuming, requires expertise and experience, while still being fairly error-prone.
Detection: Bookmakers like Pinnacle Sports and Sbobet not only are not “chasing” arbers but in fact, they welcome them to bet on their sites. However, these are the leaders of the market and they can afford it. Most bookmakers try to discourage arbers usually by setting betting limits or by blocking their accounts. Many bookmakers use shared security servers in order to pinpoint people suspected of arbitrage betting. They can also limit stakes to make arbing unprofitable and close accounts without honoring a bet that was placed. Loss of deposited money into a bookmaker could occur. This usually leads to unprofitable arbing as the most successful bookmakers are so adept at identifying arbitrage bettors. To avoid detection, people sometimes use special arbing VPN and VPS services.
Stake reviewal: Some bookmakers used to accept only very small stakes by default, while requiring larger stakes to be manually reviewed before being accepted, which basically makes it difficult for an arbitrage better to determine if a leg was completely accepted or not, until it may be too late.
Bet cancellation: If a bettor places bets so as to make an arbitrage and one bookmaker cancels a bet, the bettor could find himself in a bad position because he is actually betting with all the risks implied. The bettor can repeat the bet that has been cancelled so as minimize the risk, but if he cannot get the same odds he had before he may be forced to take a loss. In some cases the situation arises when there are very high potential payouts by the bookmaker, perhaps due to an unintentional error made while quoting odds. Many jurisdictions allow bookmakers to cancel bets in the event of such a "palpable" ["obvious"] error in the quoted odds. This is often loosely defined as an obvious mistake, but whether a "palp" in fact has been made is often the sole discretion of the bookmaker.

Other potential problems include:
 Arbers' dedicated email addresses are subject to advertising campaigns from third parties which suggests that client data may be resold behind the scenes.
 Bookmakers who encourage responsible gambling used to close accounts where they saw only large losses, unaware that the arbitrage trader has made wins at other books.
 Capital diffusion is serious; many bookmakers make it easy to deposit funds and difficult to withdraw them (requiring much additional information, and documents as proof of identity, i.e. a passport/ID copy). Making a return involves many bets spread over typically many bookmakers and keeping track requires good record-keeping and discipline.
 Responding to an available arb may require transfer of funds from one bookmaker to another, through one or more e-wallet accounts with each withdrawal requiring special approval.
 While there are commercial software products and web services available to help with some of these tasks, they are complicated and may involve significant initial investments and monthly subscription fees.
 Arbitrage bettors using software tools or web services to find arbitrages will often make an existing arbitrage even more prominent and obvious to the bookmaker because of the number of arbitrage bettors placing bets on the same outcome, so that the lifetime of an arbitrage found via such tools is often even much shorter than the average 15 minutes. Thus, the risk of seeing bets revoked is also often much higher for arbitrages found via such tools than for arbitrages found manually, that are not shared with other arbitrage bettors.
 Arbing often involves making use of bookmaker bonuses which usually require substantial transactions before being eligible for withdrawal, thus reducing total liquidity.
 Foreign currency movements can wipe out small percentage gains and can make quick calculation of stakes difficult.
 Transferring funds between bookmakers and e-wallets may create additional costs at some point; most bookmakers and/or e-wallets limit deposits to certain amounts per month.
 in the past Withdrawals used to be often limited to a certain amount per month or to a certain number of free withdrawals per month
 Withdrawals are often charged for, not just on the side of the bookmaker, but sometimes also on the e-wallet side (transfer to the bettor's bank account).
 In some countries, additional costs are imposed by government taxes, so that the final profit is further reduced by a fixed percentage of say 5% (Germany/Europe).
 Professional arbitrage betting may require considerable time and energy and requires much experience and liquidity, as well as sufficient funds to recover from inevitable losses due to the aforementioned reasons.
 Typically, arbitrages have a profit margin of only 2-5% - many other arbitrages are regarded as "high risk" ("palps"). Accordingly, profits accumulated through 20-40 successful arbitrages can be lost on a single failed bet.

See also
 Advantage gambling
 Dutch book
 Mathematics of bookmaking
 Sports betting

References

Arbitrage
Sports betting
Investment
Wagering
Gambling terminology